Mario Héctor Turdó (born 1 January 1979 in Rosario) is an Argentine football striker currently without a club.

Turdó started his playing career in 1997 with Independiente.

In 1999, he moved to Europe where he played for Celta Vigo, UD Las Palmas and CD Leganés in Spain and Stade Rennais F.C. in France.

In 2005 Turdó returned to Argentina to play for Quilmes. He has since played for Gimnasia de Jujuy and San Martín de Tucumán

External links
 Argentine Primera statistics
 Guardian statistics

1979 births
Living people
Footballers from Rosario, Santa Fe
Argentine footballers
Argentine expatriate footballers
Association football forwards
Club Atlético Independiente footballers
Quilmes Atlético Club footballers
Gimnasia y Esgrima de Jujuy footballers
San Martín de Tucumán footballers
RC Celta de Vigo players
UD Las Palmas players
CD Leganés players
Stade Rennais F.C. players
Argentine Primera División players
Ligue 1 players
La Liga players
Expatriate footballers in France
Expatriate footballers in Spain
Argentine expatriate sportspeople in France
Argentine expatriate sportspeople in Spain